Kendriya Vidyalaya karaikudi is a system of central government schools under the Ministry of Human Resource Development (India). It's located in the Chettinad region of Karaikudi, CECRI Campus. The system came into being in 1976 under the name "Central Schools", and has been affiliated with CBSE.

History 

Kendriya Vidyala, CECRI Campus, Karaikudi was founded on 17 August 1976 and initially was a branch Vidyalaya of Kendriya Vidyalaya, Madurai, with 94 students.
The Vidyalaya attained independent status with a strength of 163 students and classes up to six.
Class X and XII of Science stream were started in 1981-82 and 2007-08 respectively.
Class XI of commerce stream was started in 2017–18.

See also 
 List of Kendriya Vidyalayas

References

Central Board of Secondary Education
 
Education in Sivaganga district
Karaikudi
Educational institutions established in 1976
1976 establishments in Tamil Nadu